This is a list of flag bearers who have represented Kiribati at the Olympics.

Flag bearers carry the national flag of their country at the opening ceremony of the Olympic Games.

See also
Kiribati at the Olympics

References

Flag bearers
Kiribati
Olympic flagbearers
Flag bearers